Rock carvings at Tennes (Helleristning i Tennes) in Balsfjord, Troms county, Norway comprise figures of prehistoric rock art (bergkunst). The oldest figures have been dated to 4600 before the Current Era (BCE) and the most recent to about 2600 BCE. The figures were the first from a hunting culture that were discovered in Scandinavia.

Discovery and rediscovery
Prehistoric rock art (Bergkunst) was first mentioned in 1799 in the travel notes of professor Martin Vahl, where he described a stag carved in the mountain at a farm in Balsfjord. Prof. Vahl was a botanist at Copenhagen University, and the first botanist to visit Northern Norway.

However, these notes remained forgotten until 1913, when employees at University of Copenhagen Botanical Garden went through the notes of Prof. Vahl. At that time archeologist had started to gain an interest in rock carvings, and the finding triggered Swedish archeologist Gustaf Hallström to travel to Balsfjord to find the rock carving.

To find the carvings located somewhere along the 70 km long fjord, Hallström exploited the knowledge that a professor travelling in the 18th century must have lived on one of the ten large farms that existed along Balsfjord. One of these farms was Tennes where the locals recognized Prof. Vahl’s drawing of the stag. 

The locals led Hallström to Bukkhammaren, where they found the stag and five other animal figures. A few hundred meters away at Gråbergan they found additional figures. At this time these were the northernmost rock carvings in the world (today rock carvings have been found further north such as the several thousand figures at Alta). 

Later in 1938 at a meeting in the local knitting circle, the priest's wife showed books describing the rocks carvings above the priest’s farm. Tordis Larsen from the neighboring farm became inspired and shortly after found the field with most figures at Tennes on the Larsen farm. This field known as Kirkely had about 40 figures.

Rock carvings

There are about 60 figures distributed over three fields: Bukkhammaren, Gråbergan, and Kirkely. The figures were carved in what was at the time of carving on the seashore, but today these are situated about 20 metres above  sea level.

The oldest figures are on Bukkhammaren and these have been dated to 4600 BCE. There are only six figures, five of them are of moose, which all face the same direction. The sixth figure is undetermined. The largest figure is 1.1m.

The 40 figures at Kirkely are from about 2700 BCE, and consists of both sea and land animals (a rare combination for rocks carvings in Northern Norway). There are also 2 figures of people in boats, and some unidentified figures. 13 of the figures are of porpoise, while 14 are of moose or reindeer. There is one snake-like figure, and one skålgrop. The largest figure is a reindeer with a length of about 1.2m.

The 19 figures at Gråbergan are from about 2600 BCE, and show two people figures together with 17 figures of land animals. The size of the figures range from 1--20 cm. The animals seems to have been carved such that animals migrating between the seashore and mainland are more on the seaside, while animals in the mainland such as bear and moose are away from the sea.

Carvers
The carvings show that there had been people living at Tennes since the Stone Age. These people were probably hunters, who in the late stone age migrated between different living areas throughout the year. Tennes may already at that time have been a meeting place for the people living in the mainland (mountains), along the seashore, and on the islands.

Location
The only transportation to Tennes is by car, and it is about a 30-minute drive from the E8-E6 intersection, and about two hours from Tromsø. Road signs show the direction. The rock carvings are accessible by a 2.5 km long well-marked track starting from Balsfjord Church. The church (built in 1855) is located in Tennes, which is about 10 km from Storsteinnes (in Troms county in Norway).

See also
Petroglyph
Pre-historic art
Rock carvings at Åsli
List of rock carvings in Norway

References

Sources
 The article was based in part upon material in: Fotefar mot Nord by Ottar Grepstad, with Kirsti Mathilde Thorheim and photography by Guri Dahl  (Forlaget Press og landsdelsutvalget for Nord-Norge og Nord-Trondelag. 2003) Norwegian
 Additional information included Tennes (Prestegården), Balsfjord kommune from Helleristningsguide - Bilder I Berg I Norden  Norwegian

Related reading
Boyle, Andrew J. (2008) Solskip og stjerneguder (Fredrikstad: forlaget Opphav)    Norwegian
Simonsen, Povl  (1973) Sydskandinaviske Helleristningar I Nord-Norge. (Universitetesforlaget, Tromsø-Oslo-Bergen)  Norwegian

External links
Scandinavian Rock Art: Kirkely

Tennes
Culture in Troms
Prehistory of the Arctic
History of Troms